Portuguese Canadians are Canadian citizens of full or partial Portuguese heritage or people who migrated from Portugal and reside in Canada. According to the 2016 Census, there were 482,610 or 1.4% of Canadians claimed full or partial Portuguese ancestry, an increase compared to 410,850 in 2006 (1.3% of the nation's total population). Most Portuguese Canadians live in Ontario - 282,865 (69%), followed by Quebec 57,445 (14%) and British Columbia 34,660 (8%).

History of Portuguese in Canada

Portugal played a pioneering role in the explorations of the New World in the 15th and 16th centuries. In the 15th century, Prince Henry of Portugal, better known as Henry the Navigator, established a school of navigation in Sagres, in the Algarve region of Portugal. From this school emerged explorers who found their way to the Indies, South America, North America and Africa, including the portuguese João Fernandes Lavrador, who was the first explorer of Labrador, and Gaspar Corte-Real, who was also one of the earliest European explorers of Canada. Corte-Real explored the northeast coast of "Terra Nova", naming Conception Bay, Portugal Cove, and Labrador, named after Fernandes Lavrador. Also João Alvares Fagundes explored Newfoundland, as well as Nova Scotia, in 1520-21. In 1524 the cartographer Estêvão Gomes traveled along the coasts of northeastern North America. During his journey, he possibly reached the Cabot Strait and Cape Breton, in the present-day Nova Scotia. In 1705, the Portuguese Pedro da Silva became the first post courier in the French territory of North America, New France. He settled in the Canadian part of the territory.

During the 1950s, a large number of immigrants from the Azores and Madeira, fleeing political conflict with the regime of António de Oliveira Salazar, moved into the downtown core of Canada's major cities such as the area of Portugal Village in Toronto, Ontario and further west along Dundas Street to Brockton Village. The stretch of Dundas Street passing through Brockton Village is also known as "Rua Açores". Many other Portuguese have immigrated to Montreal since the 1960s. From the 1970s, increasing numbers of Brazilians moved into the Portugal Village, Toronto.

Recently, a number of Canadians of Goan heritage have opted to pursue Portuguese citizenship they are entitled to through their heritage as a result of Goa being an overseas province of Portugal until 1961, thus adding to the Portuguese Canadian population in Canada.

Demographics
The Toronto suburbs of Brampton and Mississauga contain large Portuguese communities.
Montreal has the second most populous number of Portuguese immigrants with an estimated 47,000. Most started immigrating in the 1960s and settled in the Le Plateau-Mont-Royal mainly around Saint Laurent Boulevard and Rachel Street. Many Portuguese stores and restaurants are located in Little Portugal.

Hamilton, Ontario also has a solid Portuguese community concentrated in the downtown core around Barton and James Street and nearby the St. Mary's Roman Catholic church. This area in Hamilton is known as "Jamesville" and is shared with a neighbouring Italian population. London, Ontario's significant Portuguese community is concentrated in the east end and south end of the city, with Portuguese restaurants and shops situated on Hamilton Road.

The Portuguese in British Columbia 
The first recorded Portuguese individual to immigrate to British Columbia was "Portuguese Joe" Silvie, from Pico Island. He arrived in BC around 1858 via California, after years in the American whaling industry. He married Khaltinaht a daughter of Grand Chief Kiapilano, and their daughter was the first child born in Vancouver of European origin, Elizabeth Walker (née Silvey). They lived in a cabin built in what is now Stanley Park and he ran Vancouver's second saloon, and was a fisherman as well. However his wife died in 1871, and in years later married a Sechelt First Nation (Shishalh) woman named Kwaham Kwatleematt (Lucy). They later moved to Reid Island where their family grew to 10 children. Portuguese Joe died in 1902, and has approximately 500 descendant. A statue in his memory now stands in Stanley Park, meters away from the totem pole display.

British Columbia has around 35 000 Portuguese-Canadians, concentrated in the Lower Mainland (Vancouver, Surrey, Richmond, Burnaby, Delta, Coquitlam) with around 20 000 Portuguese Canadians. Other centres for Portuguese immigrants and their descendants are Kitimat, Prince Rupert, Victoria, and the Okanagan region where many are fruit farmers. Many are of Azorean heritage.

In Vancouver there is a Portuguese Catholic Church, Portuguese Canadian Senior's Society, Portuguese Brotherhood of the Divine Holy Spirit with members originally from Flores Island, Azores and São Miguel Island, Tradition of Terceira (Tradição da Terceira), Friends of Pico (Amigos do Pico), and several folk dance groups, including. Cruz de Cristo (regions of Mainland Portugal), Pico, Sao Miguel Island and Madeira.

Portuguese Canadians by Canadian province or territory (2016)

Cultural Impact 
The Portuguese Canadian community chose 2003 as the year to celebrate the 50th anniversary of their officially sponsored immigration to Canada. The Honourable David Collenette, Minister of Transport and Minister Responsible for Canada Post, said that "the Portuguese Canadian community is a vibrant group that enriches the Canadian mosaic with its history, language, culture and work ethic." He added that Canada Post was proud to be issuing a stamp honouring Portuguese Canadians during the month of June, when cultural celebrations honouring the life of 16th-century poet Luís de Camões, considered Portugal's greatest poet, were taking place in many communities across the country.

Holy Spirit Societies (Irmandades do Divino Espirito Santo)
As Azoreans came to Canada from 1953 into the 1970s, numerous Holy Spirit Societies, reminiscent of the spiritual celebration of the Holy Spirit and cultural tradition present in each village in the Azores Islands, were set up by individuals from the community coming together. They participate in the International Conference of the Festivals of the Holy Spirit, which united Azorean communities around the world yearly.

Notable Portuguese Canadians
{{columns-list|colwidth=30em|*

Athletes and Sportspeople
 Fernando Aguiar, soccer player
 Kevin Alves, figure skater
 Stephen Ames, professional golfer
 Justin Azevedo, ice hockey player
 Tristan Borges, soccer player
 Mike Benevides, head coach of the BC Lions
 Meaghan Benfeito, Olympic team diver
 Johnathan Cabral, hurdler
 António Carvalho, mixed martial artist
 Dylan DeMelo, ice hockey player
 Tony Naldinho, marketing and sales leader
 Zachary Claman DeMelo, IndyCar driver
 Drew Doughty, ice hockey player, Los Angeles Kings
 Marc Dos Santos, head coach, Vancouver Whitecaps FC
 Stephen Eustáquio, soccer player
 Ben Ferreira, retired figure skater
 Ricardo Ferreira, soccer player
 Daniel Fernandes, soccer player
 Marcus Godinho, soccer player
 Julia Grosso, soccer player
 Adam Henrique, ice hockey player, New Jersey Devils
 Kequyen Lam, cross country skiing
 Priscilla Lopes-Schliep, hurdler 
 Steve Martins, retired ice hockey player for the Hartford Whalers, Carolina Hurricanes, Tampa Bay Lightning
 Jason Medeiros, football player
 Zackary Medeiros, football player
 Tony Menezes, retired professional soccer player
 Matthew Nogueira, soccer player
 Pedro Pacheco, soccer player
 Mike Ribeiro, ice hockey player, Nashville Predators
 Evan Rodrigues, ice hockey player, Pittsburgh Penguins
 Alex Silva, professional wrestler
 John Tavares, ice hockey player drafted first overall in the 2009 NHL Entry Draft by the New York Islanders
 John Tavares, retired lacrosse player
 Emanuel Viveiros, retired ice hockey player, Minnesota North Stars
 Matthew Sarmento, field hockey player, Canada
 Steven Vitória, soccer player

Film and Television
 Luisa D'Oliveira, actress, The 100
 Priscilla Faia, actress, Rookie Blue
 Louis Ferreira, actor, [[Bad Blood (TV series)|Bad Blood]], The Man in the High Castle
 Katie Findlay, actress, Man Seeking Woman, The Killing
 P. J. Marcellino, film director, film producer, journalist
 Ramona Milano, actress, Due South, Degrassi: The Next Generation
 Jon Paul Piques, internet celebrity
 Percy Rodriguez, actor, Peyton Place, Heavy Metal
 Jess Salgueiro, actress, Tiny Pretty Things, Jupiter's Legacy
 Luis Sequeira, costume designer

Historical Figures
 Marie-Joseph Angélique, slave, convicted of starting the Montreal fire of 1734
 Mathieu da Costa, translator for Samuel de Champlain, first free Black person to come to Canada
Pedro da Silva, first post courier in New France

Literature
Paulo da Costa, poet and short story writer
Anthony de Sá, novelist and short story writer
 Erika de Vasconcelos, novelist

Music
 Keshia Chanté, singer, songwriter, and actress
 Pedro Costa, singer-songwriter
 Shawn Desman, pop singer and dancer
 John Estacio, contemporary opera composer
 Danny Fernandes, pop and R&B singer
 Melanie Fiona, pop and R&B singer
 Nelly Furtado, singer, songwriter, and actress
 Anthony Gomes, blues and blues-rock guitarist and singer
 Tobias Jesso Jr., singer-songwriter
 Ashley Leitão, contestant, Canadian Idol, member, Braided
 Brian Melo, winner of Canadian Idol, season five
 Shawn Mendes, singer and songwriter 
 Armando Santiago, composer and conductor
 Lucas Silveira, singer/guitarist, The Cliks
 Matthew Tavares, guitarist, keyboardist and record producer
 BadBadNotGood

Politics and Government
 Horacio Arruda, National Director of Public Health for Quebec
 Ana Bailão, Toronto City Councillor for (Ward 18) Davenport
 Paul Ferreira, former MPP for York South—Weston
 Peter Fonseca, MP for Mississauga East—Cooksville
 Carlos Leitão, MNA for Robert-Baldwin
 Belinda Karahalios, MPP for Cambridge
 Keith Martin, physician and former MP for Esquimalt—Juan de Fuca
 Cristina Martins, former MPP for Davenport
 Alexandra Mendès, MP for Brossard—Saint-Lambert
 John Rodriguez, former Mayor of Sudbury and MP for Nickel Belt
 Mario Silva, former MP for Davenport
 Charles Sousa, former MPP for Mississauga South
 Cidalia Faria, Ontario Criminal Court Justice

Other
 Emanuel Jaques, victim of a high profile murder

}}

 Organizations 
Some Portuguese-Canadians adopt the name "Luso-Canadians" for their local social and business clubs, in reference to Lusitania, the ancient name associated with Portugal under the Roman Empire (and nowadays used in the Portuguese language as a synonym for "Portuguese". The attendance growth of organizations indicate the growth in small business and universities throughout the community.

Leading as a national voice, one can find the "Congresso", the Luso-Canadiano National Congress.

Club associations
 Alliance of Portuguese Clubs & Associations of Ontario (ACAPO)

Clubs
 First Portuguese Canadian Cultural Centre
 Associação Cultural do Minho de Toronto (ACMT)
 Canadian Madeira Club - Toronto, Ontario
 Northern Portugal Cultural Centre - Oshawa, Ontario
 Banda do Sagrado Coração de Jesus - Toronto, Ontario
 Portuguese Cultural Centre of British Columbia 
 Portuguese Cultural Centre of Mississauga
 Northern Portugal Cultural Centre, Oshawa
Luso-Can Tuna 

Sports
 The Portuguese Canadian Golfers Association - Toronto, Ontario

Portuguese-Canadian business groups
 Federation of Portuguese-Canadian Business and Professionals

Portuguese-Canadian educational groups
 University of Toronto Portuguese Association (UTPA)
 York University Portuguese Association (YUPA)

Portuguese-Canadian ethnic cultural parks
 Madeira Park - Georgina, Ontario

Portuguese publications
  Luso Life – Quarterly lifestyle magazine published in Toronto.Milénio Stadium– Weekly Portuguese newspaper published in Toronto
 Portugal News'' – news from Portugal, in English and Portuguese

See also
 Canada–Portugal relations
 European Canadians
 List of Portuguese people
 Little Portugal, Toronto
 Little Portugal, Montreal
 Portuguese Americans
 List of Portuguese Americans
 Portuguese British
 List of Portuguese Britons
 Portuguese colonization of the Americas
 Cape Verdean Canadians

References

Further reading
 .

External links
 Distinguished Americans & Canadians of Portuguese Descent.

European Canadian
 
Portuguese
Canada–Portugal relations